The 1991–92 Iowa Hawkeyes men's basketball team represented the University of Iowa as members of the Big Ten Conference. The team was led by sixth-year head coach Tom Davis and played their home games at Carver-Hawkeye Arena. They ended the season 19–11 overall and 10–8 in Big Ten play to finish in fifth place. The Hawkeyes received an at-large bid to the NCAA tournament as #9 seed in the East Region. After defeating Texas 98–92 in the first round, the Hawkeyes lost to #1 seed Duke 75–62 in the Round of 32. It was the second consecutive season Iowa lost to the eventual National Champion Blue Devils.

Roster

Schedule/results

|-
!colspan=8 style=| Non-conference regular season
|-

|-
!colspan=8 style=| Big Ten Regular Season
|-

|-
!colspan=8 style=| NCAA tournament

Rankings

References

Iowa Hawkeyes
Iowa
Iowa Hawkeyes men's basketball seasons
Hawk
Hawk